Voici is a French language weekly celebrity and gossip magazine published in Paris, France.

History and profile
Voici was founded in 1987. The magazine is published on a weekly basis and is based in Paris. The weekly is owned by the German media company, Bertelsmann/Gruner + Jahr. The publisher is the Prisma Presse, a subsidiary of Gruner+Jahr.

Voici claims the title of best selling French celebrity magazine, and second or third most widely read French women's magazine. It includes beauty, fashion, health, society and entertainment sections.

Circulation
Voici had a circulation of 602,000 copies in 1991. Its circulation was 576,000 copies in 1998. In 2000 the circulation of the magazine was 514,180 copies and it was 522,042 copies in 2001.

The circulation of Voici was 493,000 copies during the 2007–2008 period. The weekly was the third best-selling celebrity magazine in France with a circulation of 408,000 copies in 2009. Its circulation was 408,120 copies in 2010.

References

External links
 Official website

1987 establishments in France
Celebrity magazines
French-language magazines
Magazines established in 1987
Magazines published in Paris
News magazines published in France
Weekly magazines published in France
Women's magazines published in France
Prisma Media